Metropark may refer to:

A regional park, sometimes known as a metropolitan park (metropark)
Cleveland Metroparks, a regional parks system in the Greater Cleveland area
Huron-Clinton Metroparks, a regional parks system in the Detroit area
Metropark Communications, a telecommunications corporation
Metropark station, a train station in Iselin, New Jersey